Peter Wrolich (born 30 May 1974, in Vienna) is a retired Austrian professional road bicycle racer. He was known as a sprinter. He was in the top 10 of the last stage of the 2006 Tour de France, with a total of 65 points.

Major results

2002
 Rund um Köln
 Sachsen-Tour International, stage 5
2004
Rund um die Hainleite
2005
 Tour de Georgia, stage 2

External links

Austrian male cyclists
Cyclists at the 1996 Summer Olympics
Olympic cyclists of Austria
1974 births
Living people
Carinthian Slovenes
Cyclists from Vienna
20th-century Austrian people